VK Spartak UJS Komarno is a professional volleyball club based in Komárno, Slovakia. It has been playing in the Slovakian volleyball top division since 2013. The abbreviation UJS in the club's name stands for University Selye Janos which has had a partnership with the club since 2016.

Team roster - season 2016/2017 

Head coach: Miroslav Palgut

Assistant coach: Robin Pelucha

2nd Assistant coach: David Ferencz

Fitness coach: Norbert Bak

Honours 

 Slovak Volleyball Extraliga
  (x1) 2014/2015
 Slovak Volleyball Cup
  (x1) 2014/2015

References

External links 
 Official website

See also 
 Slovakia Men's Volleyball League
 Slovakia men's national volleyball team

Slovak volleyball clubs
Komárno